In the Java programming language, the wildcard ? is a special kind of type argument that controls the type safety of the use of generic (parameterized) types. It can be used in variable declarations and instantiations as well as in method definitions, but not in the definition of a generic type. This is a form of use-site variance annotation, in  contrast with the definition-site variance annotations found in C# and Scala.

Covariance for generic types 

Unlike arrays (which are covariant in Java), different instantiations of a generic type are not compatible with each other, not even explicitly: With the declaration Generic<Supertype> superGeneric; Generic<Subtype> subGeneric; the compiler would report a conversion error for both castings (Generic<Subtype>)superGeneric and (Generic<Supertype>)subGeneric.

This incompatibility may be softened by the wildcard if ? is used as an actual type parameter: Generic<?> is a supertype of all parameterizarions of the generic type Generic. This allows objects of type Generic<Supertype> and Generic<Subtype> to be safely assigned to a variable or method parameter of type Generic<?>. Using Generic<? extends Supertype> allows the same, restricting compatibility to Supertype and its children. Another possibility is Generic<? super Subtype>, which also accepts both objects and restricts compatibility to Subtype and all its parents.

Wildcard as parameter type 

In the body of a generic unit, the (formal) type parameter is handled like its upper bound (expressed with extends; Object if not constrained). If the return type of a method is the type parameter, the result (e.g. of type ?) can be referenced by a variable of the type of the upper bound (or Object). In the other direction, the wildcard fits no other type, not even Object: If ? has been applied as the formal type parameter of a method, no actual parameters can be passed to it. However, objects of the unknown type can be read from the generic object and assigned to a variable of a supertype of the upperbound.

class Generic <T extends UpperBound> {
    private T t;
    void write(T t) {
        this.t = t;
    }
    T read() {
        return t;
    }
}
...
Generic<UpperBound> concreteTypeReference = new Generic<UpperBound>();
Generic<?> wildcardReference = concreteTypeReference;
UpperBound ub = wildcardReference.read(); // Object would also be OK
wildcardReference.write(new Object()); // type error
wildcardReference.write(new UpperBound()); // type error
concreteTypeReference.write(new UpperBound()); // OK

Bounded wildcards 

A bounded wildcard is one with either an upper or a lower inheritance constraint. The bound of a wildcard can be either a class type, interface type, array type, or type variable. Upper bounds are expressed using the extends keyword and lower bounds using the super keyword. Wildcards can state either an upper bound or a lower bound, but not both.

Upper bounds 
An upper bound on a wildcard must be a subtype of the upper bound of the corresponding type parameter declared in the corresponding generic type. An example of a wildcard that explicitly states an upper bound is:

Generic<? extends SubtypeOfUpperBound> referenceConstrainedFromAbove;

This reference can hold any parameterization of Generic whose type argument is a subtype of SubtypeOfUpperBound. A wildcard that does not explicitly state an upper bound is effectively the same as one that has the constraint extends Object, since all reference types in Java are subtypes of Object.

Lower bounds 
A wildcard with a lower bound, such as

Generic<? super SubtypeOfUpperBound> referenceConstrainedFromBelow;

can hold any parameterization of Generic whose any type argument is both a subtype of the corresponding type parameter's upper bound and a supertype of SubtypeOfUpperBound.

Object creation with wildcard 

No objects may be created with a wildcard type argument: for example, new Generic<?>() is forbidden. In practice, this is unnecessary because if one wanted to create an object that was assignable to a variable of type Generic<?>, one could simply use any arbitrary type (that falls within the constraints of the wildcard, if any) as the type argument.

However, new ArrayList<Generic<?>>() is allowed, because the wildcard is not a parameter to the instantiated type ArrayList. The same holds for new ArrayList<List<?>>().

In an array creation expression, the component type of the array must be reifiable as defined by the Java Language Specification, Section 4.7. This entails that, if the component type of the array has any type arguments, they must all be unbounded wildcards (wildcards consisting of only a ?) . For example, new Generic<?>[20] is correct, while new Generic<SomeType>[20] is not.

For both cases, using no parameters is another option. This will generate a warning since it is less type-safe (see Raw type).

Example: Lists 

In the Java Collections Framework, the class List<MyClass> represents an ordered collection of objects of type MyClass.
Upper bounds are specified using extends:
A List<? extends MyClass> is a list of objects of some subclass of MyClass, i.e. any object in the list is guaranteed to be of type MyClass, so one can iterate over it using a variable of type MyClass
public void doSomething(List<? extends MyClass> list) {
    for (MyClass object : list) { // OK
        // do something
    }
}
However, it is not guaranteed that one can add any object of type MyClass to that list:
public void doSomething(List<? extends MyClass> list) {
    MyClass m = new MyClass();
    list.add(m); // Compile error
}

The converse is true for lower bounds, which are specified using super:
A List<? super MyClass> is a list of objects of some superclass of MyClass, i.e. the list is guaranteed to be able to contain any object of type MyClass, so one can add any object of type MyClass:
public void doSomething(List<? super MyClass> list) {
    MyClass m = new MyClass();
    list.add(m); // OK
}
However, it is not guaranteed that one can iterate over that list using a variable of type MyClass:
public void doSomething(List<? super MyClass> list) {
    for (MyClass object : list) { // Compile error
        // do something
    }
}

In order to be able to do both add objects of type MyClass to the list and iterate over it using a variable of type MyClass, a List<MyClass> is needed, which is the only type of List that is both List<? extends MyClass> and List<? super MyClass>.

The mnemonics PECS (Producer Extends, Consumer Super) from the book Effective Java by Joshua Bloch gives an easy way to remember when to use wildcards (corresponding to Covariance and Contravariance) in Java.

See also

 Bounded quantification
 Covariance and contravariance (computer science)
 Generics in Java#Type wildcards section explains lower and upper wildcard bounds

References 

 The Java Language Specification, Third Edition (Sun),  http://java.sun.com/docs/books/jls/
 Java Tutorials, Lesson Generics http://download.oracle.com/javase/tutorial/java/generics/index.html
 Capturing Wildcards, http://bayou.io/draft/Capturing_Wildcards.html
 Typkompatibilität in Java http://public.beuth-hochschule.de/~solymosi/veroeff/typkompatibilitaet/Typkompatibilitaet.html#Joker (in German)

Java (programming language)
Polymorphism (computer science)
Articles with example Java code